Gundiah is a rural town and locality in the Fraser Coast Region, Queensland, Australia.

Geography

The Mary River forms the western boundary.

The North Coast railway line enters the locality from the south-east (Gootchie), passes through the town and exits to the north (Netherby). The town is served by Gundiah railway station.

The land use is predominantly grazing on native vegetation with some irrigated crop-growing and plantation forestry.

History
The area was initially known as "Gootchie".  The name ''Gundiah'' is a Kabi language word meaning ''goodbye''.

The main building in the town is the pub, the Prince Alfred Hotel. The original Prince Alfred Hotel was built in 1868 but was destroyed by fire. The existing pub was built in 1947.

Gootchie Post Office opened on 1 July 1869, was renamed Gundiah in 1882 and closed in 1978.

Gundiah railway station opened in 1882.

Gundiah Provisional School opened on 18 January 1886 but closed in 1895. It reopened in 1898 and became Gundiah State School on 1 January 1909.

Gundiah Memorial Hall opened in 1922.

Economy 
There are a number of homesteads in the locality:

 Banksia Ridge
 Evergreen
 Glencobie
 High View
 Ledsforth

Education 
Gundiah State School is a government primary (Prep-6) school for boys and girls at 23 Gundiah School Road. In 2017, the school had an enrolment of 24 students with  3 teachers (2 full-time equivalent) and 6 non-teaching staff (2 full-time equivalent). In 2018, the school had an enrolment of 28 students with 3 teachers (2 full-time equivalent) and 6 non-teaching staff (3 full-time equivalent).

There is no secondary school in Gundiah. The nearest government secondary schools are Maryborough State High School in Maryborough to the north-east and James Nash State High School in Gympie to the south.

References

See also

 Gundiah railway station, Queensland

Towns in Queensland
Wide Bay–Burnett
Fraser Coast Region
Localities in Queensland